Mathai Kuzhappakkaranalla is a 2014 Malayalam family film  directed by Akku Akbar, produced by Anto Joseph. It stars Jayasurya in the lead roles while Bhama and Lakshmi Gopalaswamy play notable supporting roles.

Plot

Mathai is an innocent auto driver who unnecessarily interferes into the problems of others with a good intention of solving them. The story is happening on a harthal day, when Mathai came to meet his fiancée Annamma, an advocate clerk. The story revolves around a series of incidents when he tries to solve the problems between Dr. Nandakumar and his wife Geetha.

Cast
 Jayasurya as Mathai
 Mukesh as Dr. Nandagopan
 Bhama as Annamma
 Lakshmi Gopalaswamy as Geetha
 Sreejith Ravi as Sudhan
 Adya as Radha, wife of Sudhan
 Kuyili as Sumathi, Geetha's mother
Aju Varghese as Mathai
Thesni Khan as Omana
Geetha Salam as Teastall owner
Kollam Thulasi as Menon
Harishree Martin
 Akshara Kishor as the daughter of a separated couple

Soundtrack

The film features songs composed by Anand Madhusoodhanan and written by Children's story writer Sippy Pallippuram.

Release 
Sify stated that "Mathai Kuzhappakkaranalla? is an amateurish movie that tests your patience. Even an episode of Krishi Darshan will prove more engaging than this inane misadventure! Better to give this one a miss".

References

2010s Malayalam-language films
Films shot in Thrissur